The McDonnell PJ40 was a pulsejet engine built by McDonnell Aircraft during the mid 1940s.

Variants and applications
XPJ40-MD-2
McDonnell TD2D Katydid

Specifications (XPJ40-MD-2)

References

Pulsejet engines